Rádio Popular–Boavista is a Portuguese UCI Continental cycling team based in Porto. It is the cycling team of Boavista Futebol Clube, one of the most successful Portuguese sports club. It is one of the European teams in UCI Continental Tour and one of the oldest of the peloton, founded in 1986.

Team roster

Major wins

1998
Stage 2 Volta ao Algarve, Saulius Šarkauskas
Stage 4b Troféu Joaquim Agostinho, Saulius Šarkauskas
Young rider classification Volta a Portugal, Pedro Andrade
Stage 9, José Luis Rebollo
1999
Stage 5 GP Torres Vedras, Delmino Pereira
2000
 Road Race Championships, Marco Morais
Stage 3 Volta ao Alentejo, Pedro Soeiro
Stage 3 GP Jornal de Noticias, Delmino Pereira
2001
Overall GP Torres Vedras, Adrián Palomares
Stage 5 GP do Minho, Josep Jufré
2002
Overall GP Torres Vedras, David Bernabeu
Stage 3, David Bernabeu
Clásica a los Puertos, Josep Jufré
Tour du Finistère, David Bernabeu
2003
Melbourne to Warrnambool Classic, Simon Gerrans
 Road Race Championships, Pedro Soeiro
 Time Trial Championships, Ben Day
Stage 9 Volta a Portugal, Pedro Arreitunandia
2004
Overall Volta ao Alentejo, Danail Petrov
Stage 3, Danail Petrov
Stage 5, Joaquim Sampaio
Stage 1 GP Torres Vedras, Danail Petrov
GP Area Metropolitana de Vigo, Pedro Soeiro
2005
Stage 3 Volta de São Paulo, Pedro Soeiro
Stage 1 Volta ao Alentejo, Pedro Soeiro
Stage 4 GP Torres Vedras, André Vital
2006
Stage 2 Volta a Portugal, Manuel Cardoso
GP Area Metropoli, Jacek Morajko
Stage 7 Herald Sun Tour, Ben Day
2007
Stage 2 Vuelta a Extremadura, Joaquim Sampaio
Stages 4 & 5 Vuelta a Extremadura, Manuel Cardoso
2008
Overall GP Torres Vedras, Tiago Machado
2009
 Time Trial Championships, Tiago Machado
Stage 2 Vuelta a Extremadura, Bruno Lima
2010
 Road Race Championships, Danail Petrov
 Time Trial Championships, Sergio Sousa
2011
 Road Race Championships, João Cabreira
Stage 1 Volta ao Alentejo, Bruno Lima
2012
 Time Trial Championships, José Gonçalves
2013
Stage 1 Volta ao Alentejo, Daniel Silva
2014
Stage 7 Volta a Portugal, Rui Sousa
2015
 Portuguese Under 23 Road Race, Nuno Bico
2017
 Portuguese National Time Trial, Domingos Gonçalves
Stage 4 Troféu Joaquim Agostinho, João Benta
Stage 6 Volta a Portugal, Rui Sousa
2018
 Portuguese National Time Trial, Domingos Gonçalves
 Portuguese National Road Race, Domingos Gonçalves
Stage 3 GP Nacional 2 de Portugal, Óscar Pelegrí
Stage 6 Volta a Portugal, Domingos Gonçalves
2019
Stage 7 Volta a Portugal, Luis Gomes
Stage 8 Volta a Portugal, João Benta

Notes

References

External links 
 

Boavista F.C.
Cycling teams based in Portugal
UCI Continental Teams (Europe)
Cycling teams established in 1986
1986 establishments in Portugal